Nagorye is a rural locality (a settlement) and the administrative center of Nagoryevskoye Rural Settlement, Rovensky District, Belgorod Oblast, Russia. The population was 848 as of 2010. There are 14 streets.

Geography 
Nagorye is located 20 km northeast of Rovenki (the district's administrative centre) by road. Solontsy is the nearest rural locality.

References 

Rural localities in Rovensky District, Belgorod Oblast